the Rebel Soul Sound System is the fourth full-length album by Californian band The Dingees. The album was home recorded, self-produced & independently released free of charge on Jamendo.  The album has been described as a refining of the bands aesthetic, while remaining true to their roots.

Track listing
 "Sound Depression" – 3:00
 "Test the Champion - The Hardest Game" – 4:48
 "Blackout!" – 3:20
 "street vs. state - Global Tribal - reconstruction" – 6:26
 "Capital Imperial" – 1:58
 "Still on the Move" – 4:20
 "Port Royal Sound" – 3:26
 "Mercy Triumphs Over Judgement" – 3:19
 "Smoke Signals" – 9:42
 "Who Stole the Soul in Rock N Roll" – 5:06
 "I'll Be'Neath the Canopy" – 5:38
 "Everybody Today" – 2:10
 "One Inch Equation" – 4:48

Personnel
 Pegleg - vocals, acoustic guitar, electric guitar, drum programming, sample sequencing, synth, piano, organ, alto & baritone sax, rhodes, clavinet, artwork, recording & engineering
 Bean Hernandez - bass, electric guitar
 Aaron Landers - lead guitar, organ, piano, backing vocals, 12 string acoustic guitar, rhodes, additional engineering
 Scott Rodgers - drums, percussion, backing vocals, additional engineering
 Dave Chevalier - tenor sax, vocals
 Jeff Holmes - vocal, lead guitar
 J Bonner - organ, piano
 Beeken - saxophones, flute, clarinet
 Bryan - trumpet, flugelhorn
 Farmer - trombone
 ShermOnE - turntable, drum machine
 Kelly Mallet - backing vocals
 J Ross Parrelli - backing vocals
 Chelsea Somma - backing vocals

analog mix by Pete Mattern Planet X studio

References

The Dingees albums
2010 albums